"IITR" may refer to:

 Indian Institute of Technology, Roorkee
 Indian Institute of Toxicology Research